Carol Margaret Handley (née Taylor; born 17 October 1929) is a British former headmistress of Camden School for Girls (1971–1985) and president of the Classical Association (1996–1997). Handley is now a classics tutor at Wolfson College, Cambridge. Handley is known for her longstanding advocacy for Classics education in schools and universities, as well as for her work on teaching and examination materials for the Joint Association of Classical Teachers and for the University of Cambridge.

Career 
After completing her Classics BA at UCL in 1951, Handley began her teaching career at Queen's Gate School, London in 1952. She moved to Camden School for Girls in 1956 as a Classics teacher becoming the Senior Classics mistress. In 1965 Handley became Deputy Head and then Headmistress in 1971. She retired from Camden School for Girls in 1985. 

Throughout this time Handley was involved with the Joint Association of Classical Teachers, and was co-founder with David Raeburn and John Sharwood Smith of the JACT Greek summer school in 1968. When the original venue, Dean Close School, Cheltenham, became unavailable in 1986, she was instrumental in finding Bryanston School for the new location of the Greek summer school, working closely with James Morwood,  who had succeeded David Raeburn as Director. 

From 1991 to 2005, Handley was the director of the Reading Greek courses at the Institute of Continuing Education, Cambridge. During this time Handley became president of the Classical Association in 1996, and her presidential address in 1997 was published as Things That Matter. Handley was only the fifth woman president since the Classical Association was founded in 1903. She is now a Classics tutor at Wolfson College, Cambridge.

Personal life 
Handley married Eric Handley on 31 July 1952. He was the leading scholar in the rediscovery of the playwright Menander, writing an important commentary on the Dyskolos. He was Professor of Greek at UCL and then held the Regius Professor of Greek chair at Trinity College, Cambridge until his death in 2013. He was also a fellow of the British Academy.

Select publications 
A Greek Anthology (Carol Handley, James Morwood and John Taylor, Cambridge University Press, 2002) 
 with Pat Easterling (eds.) Greek Scripts: An Illustrated Introduction (Society for the Promotion of Hellenic Studies 2001)
 Things That Matter (Classical Association 1997)
 with Jeannie Cohen, James Morwood, James Neville An Independent Study Guide to Reading Greek (Cambridge University Press, various editions)
 The Future of Greek in Schools, Didaskalos (1967) v2 n2 p. 12-22

References 

1929 births
Living people
British classical scholars
Women classical scholars
Women heads of schools in the United Kingdom
Academics of the Institute of Continuing Education
Presidents of the Classical Association